Santa Adriana Airport is an airport serving Ovalle, a city in the Coquimbo Region of Chile.

There is rising terrain north of the runway.

See also

Transport in Chile
List of airports in Chile

References

External links
OpenStreetMap - Santa Adriana
OurAirports - Santa Adriana
FallingRain - Santa Adriana Airport

Airports in Chile
Airports in Coquimbo Region